Peter O'Connell is a feature film compositor. His works include Mr. Magorium's Wonder Emporium, Across the Universe, Stranger than Fiction, Just Like Heaven and Transporter 2.

External links
 
 CreativeCOW Profile 

Living people
Year of birth missing (living people)
Place of birth missing (living people)